The 1932 New York Yankees season was the team's 30th season. The team finished with a record of 107–47, winning their seventh pennant, finishing 13 games ahead of the Philadelphia Athletics. New York was managed by future Hall of Famer Joe McCarthy. A record nine future Hall of Famers played on the team (Earle Combs, Bill Dickey, Lou Gehrig, Lefty Gomez, Tony Lazzeri, Herb Pennock, Red Ruffing, Babe Ruth, and Joe Sewell).

The Yankees played their home games at Yankee Stadium. In the World Series, they swept the Chicago Cubs.  

The 1932 Yankees became the first team in MLB history to go an entire season without being shut out. Only two teams since, the 2000 Cincinnati Reds and 2020 Los Angeles Dodgers have gone an entire season without being shut out, though the Dodgers' season was shortened to 60 games.

Regular season
 June 3, 1932: Lou Gehrig became the first player in the 20th century to hit four home runs in one game.
 June 3, 1932: Tony Lazzeri had a natural cycle (hit a single, double, triple and home run in that order) that was also completed with a grand slam. This event is often overlooked because it was the same game in which Lou Gehrig hit four home runs.

Miller Huggins

On May 30, 1932, the Yankees dedicated a monument to their former manager, Miller Huggins. Huggins was the first of many Yankees personnel granted this honor. The monument was placed in front of the flagpole in center field at Yankee Stadium. an area which eventually became "Monument Park", dedicated in 1976. The monument calls Huggins "A splendid character who made priceless contributions to baseball."

Season standings

Record vs. opponents

Roster

Player stats

Batting

Starters by position
Note: Pos = Position; G = Games played; AB = At bats; H = Hits; Avg. = Batting average; HR = Home runs; RBI = Runs batted in

Other batters
Note: G = Games played; AB = At bats; H = Hits; Avg. = Batting average; HR = Home runs; RBI = Runs batted in

Pitching

Starting pitchers
Note: G = Games pitched; IP = Innings pitched; W = Wins; L = Losses; ERA = Earned run average; SO = Strikeouts

Other pitchers
Note: G = Games pitched; IP = Innings pitched; W = Wins; L = Losses; ERA = Earned run average; SO = Strikeouts

Relief pitchers
Note: G = Games pitched; W = Wins; L = Losses; SV = Saves; ERA = Earned run average; SO = Strikeouts

1932 World Series

Babe Ruth's called shot
Babe Ruth's called shot was the home run hit by Babe Ruth in the fifth inning of Game 3 of the 1932 World Series, held on October 1, 1932, at Wrigley Field in Chicago. During the at bat, Ruth made a pointing gesture, which existing film confirms, but the exact nature of his gesture is ambiguous. It was confirmed 88 years later in a radio clip by none other than Lou Gehrig, Ruth pointed to the center field bleachers during the at-bat. It was supposedly a declaration that he would hit a home run to this part of the park. On the next pitch, Ruth hit a home run to center field.

Farm system

LEAGUE CHAMPIONS: Newark

Eastern League folded, July 17, 1932

Notes

References
1932 New York Yankees at Baseball Reference
1932 World Series
1932 New York Yankees team page at www.baseball-almanac.com

New York Yankees seasons
New York Yankees
New York Yankees
1930s in the Bronx
American League champion seasons
World Series champion seasons